Discovery Science is a pay television network, operated by Warner Bros. Discovery EMEA, it targets several European countries' television markets. It primarily features programming in the fields of space, technology and science. The channel originally launched as Discovery Sci-Trek. Its programming is mainly in English and locally subtitled or dubbed. It is available through numerous subscription services across Europe, the Middle East and Africa. In some countries the advertisement and the announcements between programs are localized.

History
The channel launched in the UK & Ireland as the Discovery Sci-Trek on 1 October 1998, later followed by other European countries, with the channel rebranding itself as the Discovery Science Channel on 1 April 2003. Later on, the name was shortened to just 'Discovery Science'.

A 1-hour timeshift channel of Discovery Science launched in the UK and Ireland on Monday 21 April 2008 on Sky 549, which replaced a placeholder 90-minute timeshift of Discovery Channel, known as Discovery +1.5.

On 24 January 2013, Discovery channels returned on Numericable in France. In December 2016, Altice acquired an exclusivity agreement with NBCUniversal and Discovery Networks. Discovery Channel, Discovery Science and Investigation Discovery were removed from Canal+ on 17 January 2017. The channel (along with Discovery Channel) had high shares (0,5% in 2014, 0,4% in 2016) before have been removed from Canal+.

On 9 March 2022, Discovery Inc. closed Discovery Science in Russia due to Russia's invasion of Ukraine.

Programming
Beyond Tomorrow
Building the Ultimate
Burn Notice
Extreme Engineering
Food Factory
How It's Made
How Do They Do It?
How Machines Work
Invention Nation
Nextworld
Pasik
Race to Mars
Raging Planet
Rough Science
Ten Ways
The Big Experiment
Through the Wormhole
Understanding
Universe (narrated by John Hurt)
The Gadget Show

Logos
Throughout its life as the Discovery Sci-Trek Channel, the channel used an image of the rings of Saturn as its logo and in idents. When relaunching as the Discovery Science Channel, it became a stylised molecule, with the Discovery Channel globe as one of its atoms.

Since then, the channel has followed its United States counterpart The Science Channel, currently known as 'Science', in logo trends. In March 2008, Discovery Science adopted a modified version of the periodic table logo used from 2007, and in 2012, the channel adopted the new 'Morph' logo introduced in 2011.

Availability

Cable
 CAI Harderwijk : Channel 135
 Caiway : Channel 111
 Citycable : Channel 81
 DELTA : Channel 352
 Kabel Noord : Channel 255
 SFR : Channel 41
 Stichting Kabelnet Veendam : Channel 76
 UPC : Channel 377
 UPC : Channel 308
 UPC : Channel 179 , Channel 479  and Channel 679 
 Virgin Media : Channel 211
 Virgin Media : Channel 252 and Channel 260 (+1)
 WightFibre : Channel 77
 Ziggo : Channel 202

IPTV
 BT TV : Channel 336
 eir Vision : Channel 525
 KPN : Channel 83
 Tele2 : Channel 207
 T-Mobile : Channel 64
 Vodafone : Channel 307

Online
 Virgin TV Anywhere : VirginMediaTV.ie
 Virgin TV Anywhere : VirginMedia.com
 Ziggo GO : ZiggoGO.tv

Satellite
 Cyfrowy Polsat : Channel 127
 OSN : Channel 504
 Platforma Canal+ : Channel 77
 Sky : Channel 405
 Sky : Channel 167 and Channel 267 (+1)
 Sky : Channel 167 and Channel 267 (+1)
 StarSat : Channel 663
Zuku TV (Kenya): Channel 415 (replacing History) moving to Channel 421

See also
 Science Channel

References

External links
Netherlands
UK

Europe
Television channels in Belgium
Television stations in Denmark
Television channels in Flanders
Television channels in the Netherlands
Television channels in North Macedonia
Television channels and stations established in 1998
Science
Warner Bros. Discovery EMEA